The Cary House is a historic house at Searcy and Short Streets in Pangburn, Arkansas.  It is a -story wood-frame structure with an irregular floor plan and vernacular styling.  Its main facade, facing west, is dominated by a single-story shed-roof porch that wraps around to the side, and is supported by wooden box columns.  Built about 1910, it is one of White County's few pre-World War I railroad-era houses to survive.

The house was listed on the National Register of Historic Places in 1992.

See also
National Register of Historic Places listings in White County, Arkansas

References

Houses on the National Register of Historic Places in Arkansas
Houses completed in 1910
Houses in White County, Arkansas
National Register of Historic Places in White County, Arkansas
1910 establishments in Arkansas